Crimean Italians are an ethnic minority residing in Crimea.

History
Italians have populated some areas of Ukraine and Crimea since the time of the Roman Empire, but also during the era of the Republic of Genoa and the Republic of Venice. Some sources affirm that at the end of the 18th century, 10% of the population of Odessa was Italian.

In 1783, 25,000 Italians immigrated to Crimea, which had been recently annexed by the Russian Empire. In 1830 and in 1870, two distinct migrations arrived in Kerch from the cities of Trani, Bisceglie and Molfetta. These migrants were peasants and sailors, attracted by the job opportunities in the local Crimean seaports and by the possibility to cultivate the nearly unexploited and fertile Crimean lands. Italian general and patriot Giuseppe Garibaldi worked as a sailor at least twice in the region of Odessa, between 1825 and 1833. A later wave of Italians came at the beginning of 20th century, invited by Imperial Russian authorities to develop agricultural activities, mainly grape cultivation.
 
In Kerch, the Italians of Crimea built a Roman Catholic church, still known locally as the Church of the Italians. From Kerch, the Italians moved to Feodosiya (the former Genoese colony of Caffa), Simferopol, Mariupol and to other Imperial Russian seaports of the Black Sea, such as Batumi and Novorossiysk.

In the beginning of the 20th century, the Italian community was numerous enough to have a primary school and a library. The local newspaper at that time, Kerčenskij Rabocij, used to publish articles in Italian. According to information contained in the Ukrainian statistics archives, the Italians of Kerch accounted for 1.8% of the population in 1897 and 2%, or 3,000 people in 1921 to 2%.

Repression
After the October Revolution, many Italians were considered foreigners and were seen as an enemy. They therefore faced much repression.

Between 1920 and 1930, many anti-fascist Italians seeking asylum in Soviet Union were sent from Moscow to Kerch to organise the local Italian community. According to the plans of Soviet collective farming, the Italians were forced to create a kolkhoz, named Sacco e Vanzetti for the two Italian anarchists of the same name. Those refusing to comply were forced to leave or were deported. According to 1933 census, the number of Italians in the region of Kerch had already dropped by 1.3%.

Between 1936 and 1938, during Stalin's Great Purge, many Italians were accused of espionage and were arrested, tortured, deported or executed. In 1939, more Italians fled once their Italian citizenship was at risk of being lost, after the Soviet Union imposed its own citizenship onto those of foreign origin. After this, 1,100 Italians were left in Kirch and smaller amounts in other communities.

In 1942, when the Wehrmacht conquered Ukraine and Crimea, the Italian ethnic minority was deported to Asia with the same modalities of the Volga Germans, who had already been deported in August of 1941. The entire Italian community, including the anti-fascists who settled in the 1920s, was gathered and sent to Kazakhstan in sealed trains. The trip started on January 29, 1942 and lasted until March, when the convoy arrived in Atbasar and the prisoners were moved to labour camps. Half of the convoy (including all the children) died during the trip, as well as many others during the detention in the camps.
 
The few survivors were allowed to return to Kerch under Nikita Khrushchev's regency. Some families dispersed in other territories of Soviet Union, mainly in Kazakhstan and Uzbekistan.

Italians of Crimea today
The descendants of the surviving Italians of Crimea account today for 300 people, mainly residing in Kerch. As of 2021, the deportation of the Italians in Crimea during the early stages of the Soviet Union has still not been addressed by the Russian government.

References

Further reading
 Giulia Giacchetti Boiko - Giulio Vignoli, La tragedia sconosciuta degli Italiani di Crimea - Neisvestnaja traghedija italianzev Kryma - Nevidoma traghedija italijzev Krymu (Kerch, 2007). Text in Italian, Russian and Ukrainian. 
 Giulia Giacchetti Boiko - Giulio Vignoli, L'olocausto sconosciuto. Lo sterminio degli Italiani di Crimea (Edizioni Settimo Sigillo, Roma, 2008).

External links

 documents of the Italian community of Kerch
 Italiani di Crimea
 La tragedia dimenticata degli italiani di Crimea sul Corriere della Sera

History of Crimea
Crimea
Crimea
Ethnic groups in Ukraine
Ethnic groups in Russia